Martha and the Vandellas (known from 1967 to 1972 as Martha Reeves & The Vandellas) were an American vocal girl group formed in Detroit in 1957. The group achieved fame in the 1960s with Motown.

An act founded by friends Annette Beard, Rosalind Ashford and Gloria Williams, the group eventually included Martha Reeves, who moved up in ranks as lead vocalist of the group after Williams' departure in 1962. The group signed with and eventually recorded all of their singles for Motown's Gordy imprint.

The group's string of hits included "Come and Get These Memories", "Heat Wave", "Quicksand", "Nowhere to Run", "Jimmy Mack", "I'm Ready for Love", "Bless You" and "Dancing in the Street", the latter song becoming their signature single.

During their nine-year run on the charts from 1963 to 1972, Martha and the Vandellas charted over twenty-six hits and recorded in the styles of doo-wop, R&B, pop, blues, rock and roll and soul. Ten Vandellas songs reached the top ten of the Billboard R&B singles chart, including two R&B number ones, and six Top Ten Pop Hits on the Billboard Hot 100. Selected members of the group were inducted into the Rock and Roll Hall of Fame in 1995 and the National Rhythm & Blues Hall of Fame in 2013.

History

Early years (1957–1962)
Teenagers Rosalind Ashford and Annette Beard first became acquainted after a local music manager hired them to be members of a girl group he named the Del-Phis. Ashford, Beard, and lead vocalist Gloria Williams, performed at local clubs, private events, church benefits, YMCA events and school functions. They were also being coached by Maxine Powell at Detroit's Ferris Center. One of the group's first professional engagements was singing background for singer Mike Hanks.

The group originally had up to six members, subsequently reduced to four. When one of the four left the group, she was replaced by Alabama-born vocalist Martha Reeves, a former member of two groups, the Fascinations and the Sabre-Ettes. In 1960, the group signed their first recording contract with Checker Records, releasing the Reeves-led "I'll Let You Know", which flopped. The Del-Phis then went to Checkmate Records, a subsidiary of Chess Records, recording their "There He Is (At My Door)" featuring Williams on lead vocals, which also flopped.

Reeves reverted to a solo artist under the name Martha LaVaille in the hope of getting a contract with emerging Detroit label Motown. After Motown staffer Mickey Stevenson saw Reeves singing at a Detroit club, he offered her an audition. Reeves showed up at Motown's Hitsville USA studios on a Tuesday rather than Thursday, Motown's usual audition day. Initially upset with Reeves, Stevenson soon assigned her as his secretary eventually responsible for handling Motown's auditions. By 1961, the group, now known as The Vels, were recording background vocals for Motown acts. Prior to her success as lead singer of The Elgins, Saundra Edwards (then going by her surname Mallett) recorded the song "Camel Walk", in 1962, which featured the Vels in background vocals. That year, the quartet began applying background vocals for emerging Motown star Marvin Gaye, singing on Gaye's first hit single, "Stubborn Kind of Fellow" After Mary Wells failed to make a scheduled recording session feigning a short illness, the Vels recorded what was initially a demo recording of "I'll Have to Let Him Go". Motown was so impressed by the group's vocals – and Martha's lead vocals in the song – that the label CEO Berry Gordy offered to give the group a contract. Figuring that being in show business was too rigorous, Williams opted out of the group. With Williams out, the remaining trio of Ashford, Beard and Reeves were told by Gordy that they would need a new name. After failing to come up with a name on their own, Gordy gave the group the name The Vandellas. As stated in an interview with The History Makers, Ashford emphatically states that contrary to popular belief, The Vandellas were not named after Della Reese and Van Dyke Avenue, nor did Reeves come up with the name.

Motown major hit years (1962–1968)

Following their signing to Motown's Gordy imprint in 1962, the Vandellas struck gold with their second release, the first composition and production from the famed writing team, Holland–Dozier–Holland, titled "Come and Get These Memories". It became the Vandellas' first Top 40 recording, reaching number twenty-nine on the Billboard Hot 100 and peaking at number six on the R&B chart. Their second hit, "Heat Wave", became a phenomenal record for the group, reaching number four on the Hot 100 and hitting number one on the R&B singles chart for five weeks. It became their first million-seller and eventually got the group their only Grammy Award nomination for Best R&B Performance. On the single and album, the song was titled "Heat Wave". It was sometime later that the song was retitled to avoid confusion with the Irving Berlin song.

The group's success continued with their second Top Ten single and third Top 40 single, "Quicksand", which was another composition with Holland-Dozier-Holland and reached number eight pop in the late fall of 1963. Around that time, Annette, who was pregnant with her first child and set to get married, chose to leave her singing career behind by 1964. Betty Kelley, formerly of the Velvelettes, was brought in shortly afterward to continue the Vandellas' rise.

The next two singles, "Live Wire" and "In My Lonely Room" (#6 R&B Cashbox) were less successful singles, failing to reach the Pop Top 40. However, their next single, "Dancing in the Street", rose up to No. 2 on the Billboard Hot 100 and also found global success, peaking at No. 21 on the UK Singles Chart in 1964. In 1969, "Dancing in the Street" was re-issued and it was plugged heavily on radio stations. It did not take long for the song to peak at No. 4 in the UK, thus making the song one of the all-time favourite Motown single releases ever. The song became a million-seller, and one of the most played singles in history.

Between 1964 and 1967, singles like "Wild One" (US #34), "Nowhere to Run" (US #8; UK #26), "Love (Makes Me Do Foolish Things)" (US #70; R&B #22), "You've Been in Love Too Long" (US #36), "My Baby Loves Me" (US #22; R&B #3), "I'm Ready for Love" (US #9; R&B #2; UK #29) and "Jimmy Mack" (US #10; R&B #1; UK #21) kept the Vandellas on the map as one of the label's top acts. The Vandellas' popularity helped the group get spots on The Ed Sullivan Show, The Mike Douglas Show, American Bandstand and Shindig!. Throughout this period, the Vandellas had also become one of the label's most popular performing acts. On June 28, 1965, the group appeared with several other popular acts of the period on CBS-TV's Murray The K-It's What's Happening, Baby. Martha, Rosalind and Betty performed "Nowhere to Run", as they skipped through a Ford auto plant and sat in a Ford Mustang convertible as it's being assembled.

Personnel changes
Motown struggled to find good material for many of their acts after the exit of Motown contributor and Reeves' mentor William "Mickey" Stevenson in 1967 and Holland–Dozier–Holland in early 1968, but after their former collaborators left the label, the Vandellas initially continued to find success with the Richard Morris-produced singles "Love Bug Leave My Heart Alone" (US #25; R&B #14) and "Honey Chile" (US #11; UK #30; R&B #5) added to their already extended list of charted singles. In the summer of 1968, the group joined The Supremes, The Temptations, The Four Tops and Marvin Gaye in performing at the Copacabana though much like albums from the Four Tops and Gaye, a live album of their performance there was shelved indefinitely.

That same year, label changes had started to take effect, and Gordy focused much of his attention on building the Supremes' as well as Diana Ross' burgeoning upcoming solo career that would follow in 1970. The Vandellas' chart performance (and the chart performance of many Motown acts with the exception of Marvin Gaye, The Temptations, and Stevie Wonder) suffered as a result.

However it was the infighting among the members of the Vandellas that led to their problems. Kelley was the first to be let go after reportedly missing shows, as well as getting into altercations with Reeves. There were many instances where these "fights" happened on stage. Kelley was fired in 1967 and was replaced by Martha Reeves' sister Lois. Simultaneously, the group's name was officially changed to Martha Reeves and the Vandellas, to conform with the company's recent changes of The Supremes' and The Miracles' names to reflect their featured lead singers. During this time, Vandellas records including "(We've Got) Honey Love", "Sweet Darlin'" and "Taking My Love and Leaving Me" were issued as singles with diminishing success.

"Bless You" (1969–1972)
Reeves, out of the group temporarily due to illness, recovered and returned; Ashford was replaced by another former member of the Velvelettes, Sandra Tilley, and the group continued to release albums and singles into the early 1970s. Although they could not reignite the fire they had made in America they continued to have successful records in the UK and abroad. Among their late 1960s hits was "I Can't Dance to That Music You're Playing", which featured singer Syreeta Wright singing the chorus, and peaked at number forty-two. Reeves reportedly hated singing the song sensing it "close to home". In 1969 a reissue of "Nowhere To Run" reached the top 40 in the UK. In 1970, the group issued Motown's first protest single, the controversial anti-war song, "I Should Be Proud", which peaked at a modest forty-five on the R&B singles chart. The song was uncharacteristic of the Vandellas and did nothing to promote the group. On some stations, the flip-side "Love, Guess Who" was played instead, however the group reached the top 20 that year in the UK with a reissue of "Jimmy Mack".

In 1971, the group scored a top 11 hit in the UK with "Forget Me Not". later that year they scored an international hit with "Bless You" (produced by the Jackson 5's producers The Corporation). The song peaked at number fifty-three on the American pop singles chart (the biggest peak of Vandellas' seventies singles in the US), and number twenty-nine on the R&B singles chart. "Bless You" reached number thirty-three in the UK giving the group two big hits that year in England. . "Bless You" reached number 16 in Canada and went all the way to number 2 in Puerto Rico . It was to be the last Billboard Hot 100 hit single for the group. After two successive Top 40 R&B singles, the ballad "In and Out of My Life" (#22 US R&B) and the Marvin Gaye cover, "Tear It On Down" (#37 US R&B), the group disbanded following a farewell concert, held at Detroit's Cobo Hall on December 21, 1972, but Martha Reeves is still often billed as 'Martha Reeves & The Vandellas'.

The next year, Reeves announced plans of starting a solo career. At the same time, Motown Records moved its operations to Los Angeles. When Reeves did not want to move, she negotiated out of her contract with Motown, signing with MCA in 1974, and releasing the critically acclaimed self-titled debut album, Martha Reeves. Despite rave reviews of her work, neither of Reeves' post-Vandellas/Motown recordings produced the same success as they had the decade before. After living what she called "a rock & roll lifestyle" of prescription pills, cocaine and alcohol, Reeves sobered up in 1977, overcoming her addictions and becoming a born-again Christian.

Epilogue
After the Vandellas' split, Reeves' sister Lois sang with the group Quiet Elegance and sang background for Al Green, while Tilley retired from show business in the late 1970s, suddenly dying of a brain aneurysm in 1981 at the age of thirty-eight. Original member Gloria Williams, who retired from show business when she left the group, died in 2000. In 1978, Reeves and original Vandellas Ashford and Beard reunited at a Los Angeles benefit concert for actor Will Geer. In 1983, Reeves successfully sued for royalties from her Motown hits and the label agreed to have the songs credited as Martha Reeves and the Vandellas from then on. That year, Reeves performed solo at Motown 25, which alongside some of their songs being placed on the Big Chill soundtrack, helped Reeves and the Vandellas gain a new audience. In 1989, original members Ashford and Beard also sued Motown for royalties. During this time, the original trio were inspired to reunite both as a recording act and in performances. They were offered a recording contract with Ian Levine at Motorcity Records who issued the group's first single since the Vandellas disbanded seventeen years earlier called "Step into My Shoes".

Although they are no longer singing together full-time, Martha Reeves and the Vandellas have occasionally reunited for various concerts. Currently, Ashford, whose full name now is Rosalind Ashford-Holmes, and Beard, whose full name now is Annette Beard-Helton, continue to perform with other singers, most notably Roschelle Laughhunn, as "The Original Vandellas". Reeves, with her sisters Lois and Delphine Reeves, tour as "Martha Reeves and the Vandellas".

From 2005 to 2009, Reeves held the eighth seat of Detroit's city council. She has since lost her seat and told the press that she would continue performing.

A remake of the song "Nowhere To Run", sung by Arnold McCuller, is heard in the film "The Warriors" during the scene in which the Gramercy Riffs call a hit on the Warriors.

In a Season One episode of the television show The Golden Girls, Blanche described her car as the "noisiest thing to come out of Detroit since Martha & The Vandellas"..

Candice Bergen, who hosted the Saturday Night Live episode on which Martha Reeves appeared in its inaugural season, made sure that Martha Reeves and the Vandellas were a presence throughout her "Murphy Brown" series. The group's picture was displayed prominently in Murphy's office. When Aretha Franklin guest starred and Murphy tried to sing with her, Franklin stopped her, saying, "I'm not Martha, and you ain't no Vandella."

The group is briefly portrayed in the 2017 film Detroit, performing "Nowhere to Run" at the Fox Theatre in Detroit.

Awards and accolades
Martha and the Vandellas' "Dancing in the Street" was inducted into the Grammy Hall of Fame in 1999 (they were nominated for Best R&B Vocal Performance by a Duo or Group for the song in 1964). In 1993, Martha Reeves and the Vandellas were awarded the Pioneer Award by the Rhythm & Blues Foundation. Except for pre-Vandellas member Gloria Williamson and Vandellas member Sandra Tilley, all members of the group were inducted to the Rock & Roll Hall of Fame in 1995, becoming the second all-female group to be inducted. They were inducted by rock group The B-52's, whose frothy dance music was inspired by the Vandellas. They were inducted into the Vocal Group Hall of Fame in 2003. Two of their singles, "(Love Is Like a) Heat Wave" and "Dancing in the Street" were included in the list of The Rock and Roll Hall of Fame's 500 Songs that Shaped Rock and Roll. In 2004, Rolling Stone ranked the group No. 96 on their list of the 100 Greatest Artists of All Time. In 2005, Martha & The Vandellas were voted into the Michigan Rock and Roll Legends Hall of Fame.

Always concert favorites, Martha Reeves and the Vandellas were nominated for UK Festival Awards in 2010 and 2011 as "Best Headliner".

Martha and the Vandellas was inducted into the inaugural class of the Official Rhythm & Blues Music Hall of Fame at Cleveland State University August 2013

Lineups

The Del-Phis
1957–1962
Martha Reeves 
Rosalind Ashford-Holmes 
Annette Beard-Helton 
Gloria Williams

Martha & the Vandellas
1964–1967
Martha Reeves 
Rosalind Ashford-Holmes 
Betty Kelly

Martha Reeves & the Vandellas
1969–1972
Martha Reeves 
Lois Reeves 
Sandra Tilley

The Original Vandellas
2000s-present
Rosalind Ashford-Holmes 
Annette Beard-Helton 
Roschelle Laughhunn

Martha & the Vandellas
1962–1964
Martha Reeves 
Rosalind Ashford-Holmes 
Annette Beard-Helton

Martha Reeves & the Vandellas
1967–1969
Martha Reeves 
Rosalind Ashford-Holmes 
Lois Reeves

Martha Reeves & The Vandellas 
2010–present
Martha Reeves 
Lois Reeves 
 Delphine Reeves

Discography

For a detailed listing of albums and singles, see Martha and the Vandellas discography

Albums 

 Come and Get These Memories (1963)
 Heat Wave (1963)
 Dance Party (1965)
 Greatest Hits (1966)
 Watchout! (1966)
 Martha and the Vandellas Live! (1967)
 Ridin' High (1968)
 Sugar 'n' Spice (1969)
 Natural Resources (1970)
 Black Magic (1972)

Top 10 singles 
The following singles reached the top 10 on the Billboard Hot 100 song chart in the U.S.

 "Heat Wave" (1963)
 "Quicksand" (1963)
 "Dancing in the Street" (1964)
 "Nowhere to Run" (1965)
 "I'm Ready for Love" (1966)
 "Jimmy Mack" (1967)

Awards and recognition
Martha Reeves and the Vandellas' "(Love Is Like a) Heat Wave" and "Dancing in the Street" were inducted to the Grammy Hall of Fame and were both included in the list of The Rock and Roll Hall of Fame's 500 Songs that Shaped Rock and Roll.
They were inducted to the Rock & Roll Hall of Fame in 1995 becoming just the second all-female group to be inducted and the fifth group in the Motown roster to be inducted.
They were inducted to the Vocal Group Hall of Fame in 2003.
They were nominated for a Grammy Award for Grammy Award for Best R&B Performance in 1964 for their hit song "Heat Wave"
"Dancing in the Street" was included in the United States Library of Congress' National Recording Registry for its historical, artistic and cultural significance in 2006.

References

External links
 Rock & Roll Hall of Fame page on Martha and the Vandellas
 'Martha and the Vandellas' Vocal Group Hall of Fame Page
 History of Rock page on Martha and the Vandellas
 The Original Vandellas (Rosalind Ashford-Holmes & Annette Beard-Helton) page
 Martha and the Vandellas History, Charts and Songs
 Martha & The Vandellas at Doo Wop Heaven
 Martha & The Vandellas bio on the Soulwalking U.K. website.

African-American girl groups
American soul musical groups
Motown artists
Musical groups from Detroit
Northern soul musicians
1957 establishments in Michigan
Musical groups disestablished in 1972
Singers from Detroit